Tao-Klarjeti may refer to:

Tao-Klarjeti, part of Georgian historical region of Upper Kartli
Kingdom of Tao-Klarjeti, AD 888 to 1008

 
Kingdom of Iberia
Historical regions of Georgia (country)